Erich Recknagel (3 December 1904, Oberschönau, Hesse-Nassau – 16 August 1973) was a German ski jumper who competed in the 1928 Winter Olympics.

References

1904 births
1973 deaths
People from Schmalkalden-Meiningen
People from Hesse-Nassau
German male ski jumpers
Olympic ski jumpers of Germany
Sportspeople from Thuringia
Ski jumpers at the 1928 Winter Olympics